Julian Alston is an Australian American economist, currently a Distinguished Professor of Agricultural and Resource Economics and Director of the Robert Mondavi Institute at University of California, Davis, and also a published author. He is a Fellow of the American Agricultural Economics Association and Distinguished Fellow of Australian Agricultural and Resource Economics Society. Alston received his Ph.D. in Economics from North Carolina State University in 1984.

References

University of California, Davis faculty
American economists
Australian economists
North Carolina State University alumni
University of Melbourne alumni
La Trobe University alumni
Living people
Year of birth missing (living people)